Advanced Logic Research, Inc. (ALR), was an American computer company founded in 1984 in Irvine, California by Gene Lu. The company marketed IBM PC compatibles across that standard's evolution until 1997, when it was acquired by Gateway 2000. ALR had a reputation for beating its larger competitors to market with compatibles featuring cutting-edge technologies but struggled with brand recognition among the fiercely competitive market of low-end PCs in the mid-1990s. According to computer journalist and collector Michael Nadeau, "ALR's business strategy was to be the first to market with the latest and fastest possible PC-compatible designs", a strategy that "often succeeded".

History

Foundation and early products (1984–1989)

Gene Lu (born  1954) founded Advanced Logic Research in 1984. Lu had emigrated with his family from Taiwan to El Monte, California, in 1963, and had worked for Computer Automation as a systems designer in the late 1970s. Among the company's first products was an 8088-equipped motherboard for Tava Corporation's Megaplus computer. In 1986, ALR announced the first i386-based personal computer, the Access 386, in July. It would have marked the first time a major component to the IBM PC standard was upgraded by a company outside IBM; however, ALR was beaten to market by Compaq with the release of the Deskpro 386 in September. Lu considered ALR's chief rival in the 1980s to be AST Research, another Irvine-based computer company also founded by ex–Computer Automation employees. In 1985, the Singapore-based holding company Wearnes Brothers Ltd. invested $500,000 in ALR and agreed to market the company's computers in Singapore, as well as provide overseas manufacturing services, in exchange for 40 percent of ownership. This stake grew to 60 percent over the following years.

ALR was one of the first companies to license the Micro Channel architecture from IBM in 1988. The MicroFlex 7000, released in January 1989 and configured with a 25-MHz i386 and 16 MB of SIMM random-access memory, was billed as outpacing IBM's MCA-based PS/2 Model 70 due to the inclusion of a proprietary cache prefetching system in its chipset. The company's i386-based FlexCache 25386 earned the company a PC Magazine Award for Technical Excellence for desktop computers in 1988. Year-to-year sales from September 1988 totaled $40 million—one-tenth of AST's but up from $5 million in 1986—prompting Lu negotiate buying out Wearnes Brothers' stake in the company. The buyout was completed in December 1988 for an undisclosed sum. ALR later ditched Micro Channel for the directly competing Extended Industry Standard Architecture in October 1989, releasing the PowerCache/4e later that year.

1989 armed robbery attempt
The company was the victim of an attempted armed robbery of its Irvine headquarters in April 1989. Four masked intruders brandished an assault rifle and a .45 caliber handgun at a security guard's head and demanded entry into the building. Two sanitation workers ran to safety upstairs in a locked room and screamed, prompting the gunmen to flee. The guard was uninjured, and no property was stolen. This attempted robbery was one of a wave of robberies targeting technology firms for cutting-edge computer chips across the United States in 1989—five of which occurred in Orange County alone from November 1988 to April 1989.

Success and IPO (1989–1992)
ALR performed well in 1989, posting revenue of $73.1 million in fiscal year 1989, double that of their 1988 revenue. The company additionally posted between $12 to $13 million for each of the first two months of Q1 1989, compared to Q1 1988's total revenue of $13 million. Lu expressed interest in launching ALR's IPO in the next year. A crowded computer marketplace and ALR's lack of brand recognition put this IPO into question among investment bank analysts and industry journalists; Walter Winnitzki wrote that "anyone who wants to succeed will need both advanced products and a differentiated distribution approach". Its IPO nevertheless commenced on March 6, 1990, with 2.65 million shares sold through PaineWebber.

ALR was ranked the 25th and 26th largest personal computer manufacturer globally in 1991 and 1992 respectively, according to Electronics magazine—ahead of Unisys' presence in the market but behind Zeos International. Additionally, Fortune listed Advanced Logic Research as the 40th-fastest-growing company in the United States in 1992. Most of ALR's computers were manufactured locally in Orange County, but ALR's contract with its Singaporean manufacturers bartered under its ownership by Wearnes Brothers continued into the early 1990s, in order to keep the price of some of its computers down.

Downturn and purchase (1992–1997)
Following strong growth in 1990 and 1991, the company posted its first quarterly loss in Q4 1992, following fierce competition in the low-end computer market and the then-ongoing recession in the United States leading to relatively high unemployment in California. Its stock price reached a then-all-time low of $4 per share in late September 1992, and the company laid off about 100 of its roughly 670 employees in October 1992, along with imposing a company-wide progressive salary cut for employees with salaries above $50,000—including Lu. ALR struggled through 1993, posting quarterly losses in all four fiscal quarters, before returning to profitability in Q1 1994. In March 1994, the company was awarded a patent for a microprocessor upgrade path that piggybacked off an existing processor while disabling it—a technology that ALR claimed was copied by Intel and several other PC manufacturers. ALR's stock rose from $1 per share to $7.125 following the announcement. Its shares fell to $5.125 in July that year, however, due to customers waiting for Intel's P54C redesign to the Pentium processor to be released that summer. ALR anticipated another Q3 loss.

The company released the Optima SLR, the first sub-$1000 PC with a Pentium, in July 1995. Clocked at 75 MHz, the system was bare-bones and included no monitor, hard drive, or peripherals, but it came configured with 8 MB of RAM and contained four PCI card slots—two used for a graphics card and multi-I/O card—and one ISA card slot. The Optima SLR was ALR's attempt to recapture the low-end computer market the company had lost, although InfoWorld opined that the move was opportune for resellers who would boost their own profit margins by including cheap peripherals.

Advanced Logic Research was purchased by Gateway 2000 in June 1997 in a stock swap valuated at $194 million. According to Money, the acquisition afforded Gateway with ALR's "high-end client/server and high-performance desktop innovations". The company was to continue operating as a subsidiary of Gateway, with Lu remaining president while simultaneously rising to vice presidency of Gateway 2000 itself.

Citations

References

External links
 
 Advanced Logic Research at Michael Nadeau's Classic Tech

1997 mergers and acquisitions
American companies established in 1984
American companies disestablished in 1997
Computer companies established in 1984
Computer companies disestablished in 1997
Defunct companies based in Greater Los Angeles
Defunct computer companies based in California
Defunct computer companies of the United States
Defunct computer hardware companies
Gateway, Inc.